Agriophara is a genus of moths in the subfamily Stenomatinae. The genus was erected by Rudolph Rosenstock in 1885.

Species
Agriophara asaphes Diakonoff, 1948
Agriophara atratella (Walker, 1866)
Agriophara axesta Meyrick, 1890
Agriophara biornata Diakonoff, 1954
Agriophara bradleyi Diakonoff, 1954
Agriophara capnodes Meyrick, 1890
Agriophara colligatella (Walker, 1864)
Agriophara cinderella (Newman, 1856)
Agriophara cinerosa Rosenstock, 1885
Agriophara confertella (Walker, 1864)
Agriophara coricopa (Meyrick, 1897)
Agriophara cremnopis Lower, 1894
Agriophara curta (Lucas, 1900)
Agriophara diminuta Rosenstock, 1885
Agriophara discobola Turner, 1898
Agriophara dyscapna Turner, 1917
Agriophara fascifera Meyrick, 1890
Agriophara gravis Meyrick, 1890
Agriophara heterochroma Diakonoff, 1954
Agriophara horridula Meyrick, 1890
Agriophara hyalinota Lower, 1899
Agriophara leptosemela Lower, 1893
Agriophara leucanthes Turner, 1898
Agriophara leucosta Lower, 1893
Agriophara levis Meyrick, 1921
Agriophara lysimacha Meyrick, 1915
Agriophara murinella (Walker, 1864)
Agriophara musicolor Meyrick, 1930
Agriophara neoxanta Meyrick, 1915
Agriophara nephelopa Diakonoff, 1954
Agriophara neurometra (Meyrick, 1926)
Agriophara nodigera Turner, 1900
Agriophara parallela Diakonoff, 1954
Agriophara parilis Meyrick, 1918
Agriophara plagiosema (Turner, 1898)
Agriophara platyscia Lower, 1908
Agriophara poliopepla Turner, 1898
Agriophara polistis (Lower, 1923)
Agriophara salinaria Meyrick, 1931
Agriophara tephroptera Lower, 1903
Agriophara velitata (Lucas, 1900)
Agriophara virescens Diakonoff, 1954

References

 
Moth genera